Surgeon Bong Dal-hee is a 2007 South Korean medical drama television series starring Lee Yo-won (in the title role), Lee Beom-soo, Kim Min-jun and Oh Yoon-ah. It aired on SBS from January 17 to March 15, 2007 on Wednesdays and Thursdays at 21:55 for 18 episodes.

Plot
Bong Dal-hee (Lee Yo-won) approaches her life and work with a simple-minded gungho sincerity. She's had frail health since she was a little girl, and after she undergoes heart surgery, Dal-hee decides to pursue her dream of becoming a doctor. She graduates from a little-known medical school in her hometown, the remote island of Ulleungdo, and against all odds, gets accepted into the prestigious Hankook University Hospital residency program in Seoul. Dal-hee is determined to become a cardiothoracic surgeon, all the more so because of her own heart condition. Her old-fashioned name, provincial upbringing and lack of competitiveness mark her as different among the first year residents. She immediately gets on the bad side of Ahn Joong-geun (Lee Beom-soo), a brilliant but extremely strict cardiothoracic surgeon who often gets angry at the mistake-prone Dal-hee. Adding to the negative impression is Dal-hee's friendship with recently divorced general surgeon Lee Geon-wook (Kim Min-jun), who was Joong-geun's rival since their intern years. Geon-wook is attracted to Dal-hee, but he still has lingering feelings for his ex-wife, pediatrician Jo Moon-kyung (Oh Yoon-ah). Geon-wook and Moon-kyung split up after he learned that their six-year-old son was fathered by another man before they married, leaving him feeling betrayed and angry. Meanwhile, as they continue to work together, Joong-geun and Dal-hee grow closer. Called a "troublemaker" by her colleagues but loved by her patients for her compassionate personality, Dal-hee must learn to deal with professional setbacks, tensions on the job, hospital politics, patient deaths, romantic confusion and recurring ill health, on her way to becoming a full-fledged surgeon.

Cast
 Lee Yo-won as Bong Dal-hee, 1st year cardiothoracic surgery resident
 Lee Beom-soo as Ahn Joong-geun, cardiothoracic surgeon
 Kim Min-jun as Lee Geon-wook, general surgeon
 Oh Yoon-ah as Jo Moon-kyung, pediatrician
 Kim In-kwon as Park Jae-beom, 1st year general surgery resident
 Choi Yeo-jin as Jo A-ra, 1st year general surgery resident
 Song Jong-ho as Lee Min-woo, cardiothoracic surgery resident
 Kim Hae-sook as Yang Eun-ja, Dal-hee's mother
 Kim Jung-min as Bong Mi-hee, Dal-hee's younger sister
 Baek Seung-hyeon as Kim Hyun-bin, cardiothoracic surgery chief resident
 Jung Wook as Jang Ji-hyuk, general surgery chief resident
 Park Geun-hyung as Lee Hyun-taek, chief of general surgery
 Lee Ki-yeol as Seo Jung-hwan, chief of cardiothoracic surgery
 Kim Seung-wook as Professor Park
 Kim Myung-jin as Professor Jung
 Sung Woo-jin as Instructor Oh
 Jo Myung-woon as surgical intern
 Lee Bom as Ah-jeong
 Im Sung-min as Nurse Go
 Jo Ah-ra as Nurse Lee
 Jeon Hye-sang as ER head nurse
 Jo Yeon-hee as Seon-ju
 Lee Hyun as Instructor Baek
 Lee Jong-min as Instructor Seo
 Jung Sung-woon as chief of emergency medicine
 Oh Man-seok as Oh Jung-min, Moon-kyung's ex-boyfriend (guest appearance, ep 13-14)

Reception
Surgeon Bong Dal-hee was a hit; it recorded average ratings of 22.4% and a peak of 29.3%, and was number one in its timeslot for most of its run (beating the competition Dal-ja's Spring on KBS2 and Goong S on MBC). The series also received several acting, directing and popularity awards.

Awards and nominations

International broadcast
 It aired in Vietnam on HTV3 from February 9, 2009.

References

External links
 Surgeon Bong Dal-hee official SBS website 
 

2007 South Korean television series debuts
2007 South Korean television series endings
Seoul Broadcasting System television dramas
Korean-language television shows
Television series by DSP Media
South Korean medical television series
South Korean romance television series